Michelle Theriault (pronounced "terry-oh") (born April 17, 1986) is an American professional stock car racing driver. She competed part-time in NASCAR's Truck (from 2008 and 2010), and West Series (in 2005) and in the ARCA Re/Max Series in 2007. She also competed full-time in the East Series in 2007, finishing 13th in points, the highest for a female driver in that series at the time.

Racing career

Theriault's record of being the highest-finishing female driver in the East Series points at year's-end would be both broken and tied in 2013, with Kenzie Ruston's sixth place finish in the standings (that record still stands today) and Mackena Bell finishing 13th, which tied Theriault's points finish from 2007.

Theriault received limited opportunities to drive in the NASCAR Camping World Truck Series; when she did; they were start-and-park rides for DGM Racing and Fast Track Racing.

Personal life

Theriault is the wife of her former teammate at Derrike Cope Inc., Nick Tucker. They married on December 30, 2012, which is after the time they were competing in the Truck Series together.

Despite sharing the same last name and both being from New England, she is not related to fellow driver Austin Theriault.

Motorsports career results

NASCAR
(key) (Bold – Pole position awarded by qualifying time. Italics – Pole position earned by points standings or practice time. * – Most laps led.)

Camping World Truck Series

K&N Pro Series East

West Series

ARCA Re/Max Series
(key) (Bold – Pole position awarded by qualifying time. Italics – Pole position earned by points standings or practice time. * – Most laps led.)

References

External links
 

1986 births
NASCAR drivers
ARCA Menards Series drivers
Living people
People from Bristol, Connecticut
Racing drivers from Connecticut
American female racing drivers
Cope family
Racing drivers' wives and girlfriends